Brush Creek is a tributary of Connoquenessing Creek in western Pennsylvania. The watershed is roughly 35% agricultural, 42% forested and the rest is other uses.

References

Rivers of Pennsylvania
Tributaries of the Beaver River
Rivers of Beaver County, Pennsylvania
Rivers of Butler County, Pennsylvania
Rivers of Allegheny County, Pennsylvania